Los Número Uno: Éxitos 1968-2003 (The Number Ones 1968-2003) (2003) is the twentieth album and second compilation album by Mexican rock and blues band El Tri. Going back to the end of the Sixties when the band was only a trio known as Three Souls in my Mind the compilation take a couple of songs 30 years old as well as hits up to the latest albums.

Track listing 
All tracks by Alex Lora except where noted.

Disc one 
 "A.D.O. (En Vivo)" (A.D.O. (Live)) – 6:34 (Es lo Mejor, 1974)
 "Nuestros Impuestos" (Our Taxes) – 2:30 (Es lo Mejor, 1974)
 "Abuso de Autoridad" (Authority Abuse) – 2:01 (Chavo de Onda, 1973)
 "Oye Cantinero" (Hey, Bartender) – 2:39 (Three Souls in My Mind III, 1972)
 "Perro Negro y Callejero" (Black And Stray Dog) – 3:05 (Chavo de Onda, 1973)
 "Triste Canción" (Sad Song) – 5:42 (Simplemente, 1984)
 "Metro Balderas" (Rodrigo González) (Balderas Subway) – 5:42 (Simplemente, 1984)
 "Que Viva el Rock and Roll" – 2:44 (Three Souls in My Mind III, 1972)
 "El Blues de la Llanta" (Lora, Sergio Mancera) (The Tire Blues) – 7:33 (Qué Rico Diablo, 1977)
 "San Juanico" – 5:25 (Simplemente, 1984)
 "El Niño Sin Amor" (The Child Without Love) – 3:07 (El Niño Sin Amor, 1986)
 "Mente Rockera" (Rocking Mind) – 4:18 (La Devaluación, 1975)
 "Difícil" (Lora, Horacio Reni) (Difficult) – 2:46 (21 Años Después, Alex Lora y El Tri, 1989)
 "Maria Sabina" – 5:13 (21 Años Después, Alex Lora y El Tri, 1989)
 "Let Me Swim" – 3:50 (Ernesto De León, Lora) Three Souls in My Mind, 1970

Disc two 
 "Millones de Niños" (Millions Of Children) – 8:08 (Una Leyenda Viva Llamada El Tri, 1990)
 "Pobre Soñador" (Lora, Felipe Souza) (Poor Dreamer) – 3:51 (25 Años, 1993)
 "Los Minusválidos" (Chicho Mora, Lora, Martinez, Rafael Salgado, Ruben Soriano, Souza) (The Handicapped) – 3:16 (Una Rola Para los Minusvalidos, 1994)
 "Las Piedras Rodantes" (The Rolling Stones) – 3:19 (Una Rola Para los Minusvalidos, 1994)
 "Todo Sea Por el Rocanrol" (All For Rock `n Roll) – 4:45 Hoyos en la Bolsa, 1996
 "Virgen Morena" (Brown-Skinned Virgin) – 4:33 (Cuando Tú No Estás, 1997)
 "Parece Fácil" (It Looks Easy) – 4:35 (Cuando Tú No Estás, 1997)
 "El Muchacho Chicho" The Neat Guy – 5:10 (Cuando Tú No Estás, 1997)
 "Todo Me Sale Mal" (Everything I Do Go Wrong) – 3:44 (Fin de Siglo, 1998)
 "Vicioso" (Lora, Mancera) (Vicious) – 2:26 (Simplemente, 1984)
 "Madre Tierra" (Mother Earth) – 3:46 (No Podemos Volar, 2000)
 "Esclavo del Rocanrol" (Slave of Rock`n Roll) – 3:13 (Cuando Tú No Estás, 1997)
 "No Te Olvides de la Banda" (Don't Forget About the Band) – 4:33 (No Te Olvides de la Banda, 2002)
 "Chilango Incomprendido" (Misunderstood Chilango) – 2:57 (25 Años, 1993)
 "Nostalgia" – 5:27 (Fin de Siglo, 1998)

Album and year of original release inside parenthesis

Personnel 
 Alex Lora – guitar, bass, vocals, producer, mixing, compilation
 Rafael Salgado – harmonic
 Eduardo Chico – guitar
 Oscar Zarate – guitar
 Chela Lora – backing vocals, art direction, compilation
 Ramon Perez – drums
 Pedro Martinez – drums
 Ruben Soriano – bass
 Mariano Soto – drums
 Felipe Souza – guitar
 Sergio Mancera – guitar
 Tulio Bagnara  – general coordination
 Luis Gil – remastering
 Hula – design

External links 
www.eltri.com.mx
Los Número Uno (disc one) at MusicBrainz
Los Número Uno (disc one) at MusicBrainz
[ Los Número Uno] at AllMusic

El Tri compilation albums
2003 greatest hits albums
Warner Music Group compilation albums